Yu Zhuanghui (born 12 April 1962) is a Chinese sprinter. He competed in the men's 100 metres at the 1984 Summer Olympics.

References

1962 births
Living people
Athletes (track and field) at the 1984 Summer Olympics
Chinese male sprinters
Olympic athletes of China
Place of birth missing (living people)
Asian Games medalists in athletics (track and field)
Asian Games gold medalists for China
Athletes (track and field) at the 1982 Asian Games
Athletes (track and field) at the 1986 Asian Games
Medalists at the 1982 Asian Games
Medalists at the 1986 Asian Games